The 1979 Boise State Broncos football team represented Boise State University in the 1979 NCAA Division I-AA football season. The Broncos competed in the Big Sky Conference and played their home games on campus at Bronco Stadium in Boise, Idaho. They were led by fourth-year head coach Jim Criner and an offensive backfield of juniors: quarterback Joe Aliotti, fullback David Hughes, halfback Cedric Minter, with halfback Terry Zahner 

Senior quarterback Hoskin Hogan dropped out of school and junior college transfer Aliotti won the starting job.

After an opening two-point loss at home, BSU won ten straight; the league opener in late September set a Big Sky attendance record   shutout win for BSU, it was the only blemish for Montana State  in conference play, but three non-conference losses kept them out of the four-team I-AA playoffs; the western postseason bid went again to fifth-ranked Nevada-Reno  who finished their first season in the Big Sky at

Schedule

Roster

All-conference
Halfback Cedric Minter was a repeat selection to the all-conference team, joined by quarterback Joe Aliotti, wide receiver Kipp Bedard, guard Shawn Beaton, defensive tackle Doug Scott, linebacker Ralph Esposito, and safety Rick Woods. Second team selections were fullback David Hughes, halfback Terry Zahner, wide receiver Mike Brady, defensive tackle Randy Trautman, nose guard Willie Tufono, linebacker Dan Williams, and cornerback Chris Bell.

References

Boise State
Boise State Broncos football seasons
Boise State Broncos football